Mullin High School or Mullin School is a public high school located in Mullin, Texas, United States and classified as a 1A school by the UIL. It is part of the Mullin Independent School District located in northwest Mills County. Mullin School has all grades (K-12) in one building. In 2015, the school was rated "Met Standard" by the Texas Education Agency.

Athletics
The Mullin Bulldogs compete in the following sports - 

Basketball
6-Man Football
Golf
Tennis
Track and Field
Volleyball

See also

List of high schools in Texas
List of Six-man football stadiums in Texas

References

External links
Mullin ISD

Schools in Mills County, Texas
Public high schools in Texas